Milorad Kukoski (born 7 December 1987) is a Macedonian handball player who plays for RK Eurofarm Pelister and for the Macedonia national handball team.

References
http://www.eurohandball.com/ec/ehfc/men/2011-12/player/527106/Milorad+Kukoski
http://europeancup.eurohandball.com/ehfc/men/2013-14/player/527106/Milorad+Kukoski

1987 births
Living people
Macedonian male handball players
Sportspeople from Struga
Macedonian expatriate sportspeople in Romania
Expatriate handball players